Doan's Hollow Public School is a defunct public elementary school that existed from the early 20th century until c. 1980.

Due to its status as one of the first two schools that taught the mentally disabled, it was considered to be a "pioneer school" for the disabled population of Norfolk County. Special education programs were eventually introduced to the other elementary schools in Norfolk County, Ontario, Canada that allowed children to attend schools that were closer to their homes. Doan's Hollow Public School was a feeder school to Simcoe Composite School during its years of operation although it also shared close proximity to Port Dover Composite School (when it first opened in 1962).

Alumni
Red Kelly attended Doan's Hollow Public School during the 1930s.

Present day use
The former site of the school was being used as a meeting hall for members of the Jehovah's Witness faith until its official sale to a secular buyer shortly after October 2016.

References

Bibliography
Special Education in Ontario Schools, Ken Weber, Highland Press (1999), 

Elementary schools in Norfolk County, Ontario
Educational institutions disestablished in 1980
1980 disestablishments in Ontario